Jez Carne, born Jeremy Carne is a radio presenter in Australia. He acts as Web Geezer Jez on The Hamish & Andy Show. He won an ACRA in 2009 for Best Multimedia Execution on Hamish and Andy's, Tall Ship Adventure. He was co-founder, producer and host of The Punk Rock Show on 4Q Radio from late 2003 to early 2006.

He is a guitarist and vocalist in rock band JACK from 2004 to 2006.

Jez currently co-presents a weekly webcast called Thisisntradio with Cackling Jack (Jack Post).
Thisisntradio streams live at ustream.com every Wednesday at 8.30; and has featured such guests as; Hamish Blake and Hayden "Haydo" Guppy.

Season Finale was held on 19 May for Jez to go on the Caravan of Courage with Hamish & Andy.

The show started off well after a 6-week hiatus with Ryan Shelton starting the show in a hotel in Melbourne.

References

External links 
 Website on Tall Ship Adventures show

Australian radio presenters
Australian rock guitarists
Australian rock singers
Living people
Year of birth missing (living people)